Fresia is a city and commune in Llanquihue Province, Los Lagos Region, Chile.

Demographics
Of these, 6,144 (48%) lived in urban areas and 6,660 (52%) in rural areas. The population fell by 1.6% (209 persons) between the 1992 and 2002 censuses.

Administration
As a commune, Fresia is a third-level administrative division of Chile administered by a municipal council, headed by an alcalde who is directly elected every four years. The 2008-2012 alcalde is Bernardo Espinoza Villalobos (PS).

Within the electoral divisions of Chile, Fresia is represented in the Chamber of Deputies by Fidel Espinoza (PS) and Carlos Recondo (UDI) as part of the 56th electoral district, together with Puyehue, Río Negro, Purranque, Puerto Octay, Frutillar, Llanquihue, Puerto Varas and Los Muermos. The commune is represented in the Senate by Camilo Escalona Medina (PS) and Carlos Kuschel Silva (RN) as part of the 17th senatorial constituency (Los Lagos Region).

References

External links
  Municipality of Fresia

Populated places in Llanquihue Province